William Rex Dunlop (21 September 1927 – 20 May 2019) was a Scottish footballer who played for Rangers and Dumbarton.

References

1927 births
2019 deaths
Scottish footballers
Dumbarton F.C. players
Rangers F.C. players
Workington A.F.C. players
Cheltenham Town F.C. players
Scottish Football League players
English Football League players
Association football forwards